The Our Lady of the Sacred Heart (locally known as Tas-Sinjura (of the Signora)) is a Roman Catholic church in Iż-Żejtun in the South Eastern Region of Malta. It is dedicated to the Sacred Heart of Mary.

It is listed Grade 2 on the National Inventory of the Cultural Property of the Maltese Islands.

The chapel was completed in 1881; its construction was funded by the Noble Margerita dei Conti Manduca. A heavy cornice surmounts the plain facade with a belfry above the cornice. A triangular pediment surmounts the doorway.

References

External link

Our Lady of the Sacred Heart at Quddies

Żejtun
National Inventory of the Cultural Property of the Maltese Islands
Roman Catholic chapels in Malta
Roman Catholic churches completed in 1881
19th-century Roman Catholic church buildings in Malta